La Crosse County is a county located in the U.S. state of Wisconsin. At the 2020 census, the population was 120,784. Its county seat is La Crosse. La Crosse County is included in the La Crosse-Onalaska, WI-MN Metropolitan Statistical Area with a population of 139,627 and is the most populous county on Wisconsin's western border.

Geography

Major highways

  Interstate 90
  U.S. Highway 14
  U.S. Highway 53
  U.S. Highway 61
  Highway 16 (Wisconsin)
  Highway 33 (Wisconsin)
  Highway 35 (Wisconsin)
  Highway 108 (Wisconsin)
  Highway 162 (Wisconsin)

Railroads
Amtrak
BNSF
Canadian Pacific
La Crosse station

Buses
La Crosse MTU
Scenic Mississippi Regional Transit
List of intercity bus stops in Wisconsin

Airport
 LSE - La Crosse Regional Airport

Adjacent counties
 Trempealeau County - northwest
 Jackson County - northeast
 Monroe County - east
 Vernon County - south
 Houston County, Minnesota - southwest
 Winona County, Minnesota - west

Climate
La Crosse County's location in the United States' upper midwest  gives the area a temperate, continental climate.

Demographics

As of the census of 2020, the population was 120,784. The racial makeup of the county was 88.0% White, 4.6% Asian, 1.7% Black or African American, 0.4% Native American, 0.9% from other races, and 4.4% from two or more races. Ethnically, the population was 2.5% Hispanic or Latino of any race.

According to 2014–2018 ACS estimates, the median household income was $55,479 and the median family income was $67,388. Males had a median income of $48,675 and females $38,714. The per capita income was $26,065. About 9.1% of families and 10.9% of the population were below the poverty line, including 8.2% of those under age 18 and 7.3% of those age 65 or over.

At the 2010 census, there were 114,638 people, 46,137 households and 27,373 families residing in the county. The racial make up was 92.1% White, 1.4% Black or African American, 0.4% Native American, 4.1% Asian, 0.00% Pacific Islander, 0.3% from other races, and 1.6% from two or more races. 0.92% of the population were Hispanic or Latino of any race. 38.9% were of German, 20.3% Norwegian and 7.9% Irish ancestry. 
In 2017, there were 1,188 births, giving a general fertility rate of 47.9 births per 1000 women aged 15–44, the fifth lowest rate out of all 72 Wisconsin counties.

Government
 Board Chair: Monica Kruse 
 District Attorney: Tim Gruenke (D)
 Sheriff: John Siegel (D)
 County Clerk: Ginny Dankmeyer (D)
 County Treasurer: Amy Twitchell (D)
 Register of Deeds: Robin Kadrmas (D)
 Board of Supervisors: (29 members) (D Majority)
 County Administrator: Steve O'Malley

Politics
La Crosse County has voted for the Democratic nominee in every presidential election since 1988. The Milwaukee Journal Sentinel ranked La Crosse County as one of Wisconsin's most Democratic counties. As a result of the 2020 presidential election, La Crosse County continued its Democratic trend by about 4% with a 13% lead over Republicans. In the 2022 United States elections Democrats won every contested race in La Crosse County and flipped the Sheriff's race for the first time in recent history.

La Crosse County is within the Wisconsin State Senate district 32, represented by Brad Pfaff (D). It also contains Wisconsin State Assembly districts 95 Jill Billings (D) and 94 Steve Doyle (D). Democrats also hold a majority of seats on the La Crosse County Board of Supervisors.

Communities

Cities

 La Crosse (county seat)
 Onalaska

Villages
 Bangor
 Holmen
 Rockland
 West Salem

Towns

 Bangor
 Barre
 Burns
 Campbell
 Farmington
 Greenfield
 Hamilton
 Holland
 Medary
 Onalaska
 Shelby
 Washington

Census-designated places
 Brice Prairie, part of the Town of Onalaska and an urban reserve area of the City of Onalaska
 French Island
 St. Joseph

Unincorporated communities

 Barre Mills
 Burns
 Burns Corners
 Burr Oak
 Council Bay
 Medary
 Middle Ridge
 Midway
 Mindoro
 New Amsterdam
 Newberg Corners
 Shelby
 Stevenstown
 West La Crosse

See also
 National Register of Historic Places listings in La Crosse County, Wisconsin
 Upper Mississippi River National Wildlife and Fish Refuge

References

Further reading
 Biographical History of La Crosse, Monroe and Juneau Counties, Wisconsin. Chicago: Lewis Publishing Company, 1892.
 Biographical History of La Crosse, Trempealeau and Buffalo Counties, Wisconsin. Chicago: Lewis Publishing Company, 1892.
 History of La Crosse County, Wisconsin. Chicago: Western Historical Company, 1881.
 Bryant, Benjamin F. (ed.). Memoirs of La Crosse County. Madison, Wis.: Western Historical Association, 1907.
 Wisconsin Jubilee: Proceedings of the Celebration by the County and City of La Crosse on Wisconsin having achieved fifty years of statehood. La Crosse, Wis.: Republican and Leader Print, 1898.

External links
 La Crosse County
 La Crosse County Health and Demographic Data
 La Crosse County map from the Wisconsin Department of Transportation

 
1851 establishments in Wisconsin
Wisconsin counties on the Mississippi River
Populated places established in 1851